The 2012–13 Euro Hockey League was the sixth season of the Euro Hockey League, Europe's premier club field hockey tournament organized by the EHF. It was held at four different locations from October 2012 to May 2013.

The final was played between Bloemendaal and Dragons at Sportpark 't Kopje, in Bloemendaal, Netherlands. The hosts Bloemendaal defeated Dragons 2–0 to win their second title. UHC Hamburg were the defending champions but they did not qualify for this season's edition. Amsterdam took the bronze medal.

Teams

Group phase
The 24 teams were drawn into eight pools of three. In each pool, teams played against each other once in a round-robin format. The pool winners and runners-up advanced to the round of 16. Pools A, C, E, and F were played in Barcelona, Spain from 12 to 14 October 2012 and the other pools were played in East Grinstead, England from 26 to 28 October 2012. If a game was won, the winning team received five points. A draw resulted in both teams receiving two points. A loss gave the losing team one point unless the losing team lost by three or more goals, then they received zero points.

Pool A

Pool B

Pool C

Pool D

Pool E

Pool F

Pool G

Pool H

Knockout stage
The round of 16 and the quarter-finals were played in Amstelveen, Netherlands from 29 March to 1 April 2013 and the semi-finals, bronze medal match and the final were played in Bloemendaal, Netherlands from 18 to 19 May 2013.

Bracket

Round of 16

Quarter-finals

Semi-finals

Bronze medal match

Final

External links 
 Official Website (English)
 European Hockey Federation

Euro Hockey League
2012–13 in European field hockey